The Murrayfield Racers were an ice hockey team founded in 2018 and based in Edinburgh, Scotland who played in the Scottish National League (SNL).

History

The original Murrayfield Racers were founded in 1952 as the Murrayfield Royals, becoming the Racers in 1966. The team continued to represent the Scottish Capital until they fell into financial troubles and folded in 1996. They were replaced by the Edinburgh Capitals who were a member of the United Kingdom's premier ice hockey league, the EIHL, until they folded in 2018.   

The second incarnation of the Murrayfield Racers was founded in 2018 and were awarded the Murrayfield Ice Rink contract in the April of that year. The Racers applied for entry in to the EIHL for the 2018–2019 season but were ultimately denied entry and the Capitals, now with no home venue, ceased operations at the end of the 2017–2018 EIHL season.

In June 2018, the Racers were accepted in to the Scottish National League to represent Edinburgh for the 2018–2019 season, while representing the city in the NIHL North Cup, playing their home games at the Murrayfield Ice Rink. Murrayfield withdrew from the SNL for the 2021-22 season.

In July 2022, the ice contract at Murrayfield Ice Rink was awarded to the revived Edinburgh Capitals, coached by Steven Lynch. The Capitals would take the spot vacated by the Racers, beginning with the 2022-23 Scottish National League season.

Club roster 2020–21

2020/21 Outgoing

Season Record

References 

Ice hockey teams in Scotland
Sports teams in Edinburgh
Ice hockey clubs established in 2018
2018 establishments in Scotland